Armenia competed at the 2014 Summer Youth Olympics, in Nanjing, China from 16 August to 28 August 2014.

Medalists

Boxing

Armenia qualified two boxers based on its performance at the 2014 AIBA Youth World Championships

Boys

Girls

Diving

Armenia qualified one diver based on its performance at the Nanjing 2014 Diving Qualifying Event.

Gymnastics

Artistic Gymnastics

Armenia qualified one athlete based on its performance at the 2014 European MAG Championships. Vigen Khachatryan had problems with his back and consequently did not perform on parallel bars and horizontal bar. With the performance on all apparatus being a requirement for gymnasts at the YOG, Vigen was not eligible to advance to the finals.

Boys

Judo

Armenia qualified one athlete based on its performance at the 2013 Cadet World Judo Championships.

Individual

Team

Shooting

Armenia qualified two shooters based on its performance at the 2014 European Shooting Championships.

Individual

Team

Swimming

Armenia qualified one swimmer.

Boys

Weightlifting

Armenia qualified 2 quotas in the boys' events based on the team ranking after the 2013 Weightlifting Youth World Championships. Later Armenia qualified 1 quota in the girls' events based on the team ranking after the 2014 Weightlifting Youth European Championships.

Boys

Girls

Wrestling

Armenia qualified three athletes based on its performance at the 2014 European Cadet Championships.

Boys

References

2014 in Armenian sport
Nations at the 2014 Summer Youth Olympics
Armenia at the Youth Olympics